The Davis-Goff Baronetcy, of Glenville in the Parish of St Patrick's in the County of Waterford, is a title in the Baronetage of the United Kingdom. It was created on 8 December 1905 for William Davis-Goff. He was Sheriff of Waterford in 1869 and 1899 and High Sheriff of County Waterford in 1892. The second Baronet was High Sheriff of County Waterford in 1914.

Davis-Goff baronets, of Glenville (1905)
Sir William Goff Davis-Goff, 1st Baronet (1838–1918) 
Sir Herbert William Davis-Goff, 2nd Baronet (1870–1923) 
Sir Ernest William Davis-Goff, 3rd Baronet (1904–1980) 
Sir Robert William Davis-Goff, 4th Baronet (born 1955)

The heir apparent to the baronetcy is William Nathaniel Davis-Goff (born 1980), eldest son of the 4th Baronet.

References

Kidd, Charles, Williamson, David (editors). Debrett's Peerage and Baronetage (1990 edition). New York: St Martin's Press, 1990.

Davies-Goff